There have been three baronetcies created for persons with the surname Harland, one in the Baronetage of Great Britain and two in the Baronetage of the United Kingdom. All three creations are extinct.

The Harland Baronetcy, of Sproughton in the County of Suffolk, was created in the Baronetage of Great Britain on 13 March 1771 for Admiral Robert Harland, subsequently a Lord of the Admiralty in 1782. The title became extinct on the death of his son, the second Baronet, in 1848.

The Harland Baronetcy, of Sutton Hall in the County of York, was created in the Baronetage of the United Kingdom on 3 October 1808 for Charles Harland. Born Charles Hoar, he had married Anne Harland, only daughter and heiress of Philip Harland, of Sutton Hall, Yorkshire, in 1802, and had assumed the same year the surname of Harland in lieu of his patronymic. He was childless and the title became extinct on his death in 1810. William Charles Harland, Member of Parliament for Durham, was the nephew of Philip Harland.

The Harland Baronetcy, of Ormiston in the Parish of Holywood in the County of Down and of Brompton in the North Riding of the County of York, was created in the Baronetage of the United Kingdom on 25 July 1885 for the shipbuilder and politician Edward Harland. The title became extinct on his death in 1895.

Harland baronets, of Sproughton (1771)
Sir Robert Harland, 1st Baronet (1715–1784)
Sir Robert Harland, 2nd Baronet (1765–1848)

Harland baronets, of Sutton Hall (1808)

Sir Charles Harland, 1st Baronet (died 1810)

Harland baronets, of Ormiston and Brompton (1885)
Sir Edward James Harland, 1st Baronet (1831–1895)

References

Extinct baronetcies in the Baronetage of Great Britain
Extinct baronetcies in the Baronetage of the United Kingdom